Etihad Campus is a tram stop on the East Manchester Line (EML) of Greater Manchester's light-rail Metrolink system. The stop is located adjacent to the City of Manchester Stadium (also known as the Etihad Stadium). The stop has a staggered platform layout, and has wide platforms in order to cope with large crowds which use the stop on match days or other events at the stadium.

Initially intended to be known as Sportcity-Stadium, after the Sportcity area it serves, the proposal was changed following the announcement of Manchester City's Etihad Campus project. The station opened on 11 February 2013, after a three-day free trial for local residents. The station was constructed as part of Phase 3a of the Metrolink's expansion.

Services
Services are mostly every 12 minutes on all routes.

Additional trams and double trams run at events such as football matches and concerts at the nearby Etihad Stadium. A stabling siding to accommodate waiting trams prior to the event finishing has been constructed to allow quicker transportation of people following the conclusion of such events.

References

External links

Etihad Campus Stop Information
Etihad Campus area map
 Light Rail Transit Association

Tram stops in Manchester
Tram stops on the Bury to Ashton-under-Lyne line
Manchester City F.C.